is a form of brocading from Saga Prefecture, Japan. It is a unique form of brocading in that Japanese paper is used as the warp. This paper is coated in either gold, silver or lacquer. The weft is a silk thread which is dyed. As the technique is time-consuming, only several inches are produced each day.

History
Saga Nishiki was created at the end of the Edo period by Kashima Nabeshima, the daimyō of Saga. At this time it was referred to as Kashima Nishiki. It was not until the Japan–British Exhibition of 1910 that it was renamed "Saga Nishiki".

Gallery

References

External links 

 Saga Chamber of Commerce and Industry - Saga Nishiki

See also
 Brocade

Textile-related meibutsu